"Get Ugly" is a song by American singer Jason Derulo for his fourth studio album Everything Is 4 (2015). It was released as the album's fourth single (third in US markets) on December 15, 2015. Derulo co-wrote the song with Jason Evigan, Sean Douglas, and Ricky Reed; the latter is also the producer. The track samples "We Got Our Own Thang" by Heavy D & the Boyz from their second studio album Big Tyme.

Music video
A music video for the track, directed by Syndrome, premiered via Derulo's YouTube channel on December 14, 2015. Allison Bowsher of Much TV channel called it a "good old fashioned dance video" and wrote that it "showcase his talent as a dancer". Colin Joyce from Spin wrote that the video "plays like a re-imagining of Lionel Richie's "All Night Long" video". Radio.com's Amanda Wicks said that Derulo "shows off some fresh moves by way of slick choreography" throughout the video.

Track listing
CD single
"Get Ugly"
"Try Me" (featuring Jennifer Lopez and Matoma)

Charts and certifications

Weekly charts

Year-end charts

Certifications

Release history

References

External links

2015 songs
2015 singles
Jason Derulo songs
Songs written by Jason Evigan
Songs written by Sean Douglas (songwriter)
Warner Records singles
Songs written by Jason Derulo
Songs written by Ricky Reed